Mana Island may refer to:

Mana Island (Fiji), island in Fiji in the Mamanuca chain
Mana Island (New Zealand), off the southwestern coast of the North Island of New Zealand
Mana Island (band), a Russian rock band on Xuman Records

See also
 Mana (disambiguation)